Κalyvia is a village in Laconia, southern Greece. It is part of the municipal unit Gytheio. It has a population of 86 (2011).

Historical population

See also

List of settlements in Laconia

References

External links
GTP - Kalyvia

Populated places in Laconia
Populated places in the Mani Peninsula
East Mani